Dorothy Cameron Bloore (1924–2000) was a Canadian art dealer, and installation artist in Toronto, Ontario. Her works can be found in the Robert McLaughlin Gallery, Oshawa and the Art Gallery of Hamilton.

Biography 
Dorothy Cameron initially worked at assisting institutions such as the Bishop Strachan School and the Volunteer Committee of the Art Gallery of Ontario in Toronto. She also became a panelist on the CTV show To Tell the Truth. She began her career as an art dealer and consultant in 1957 as an apprentice at the Gallery of Contemporary Art in Toronto and as the assistant director at the Jordan Gallery in 1958. In 1958, she opened the Here and Now Gallery showcasing contemporary Canadian work and in 1962, moved to a new and better location on Yonge street in Toronto as the Dorothy Cameron Gallery Ltd. In 1963, she decided to concentrate on sculpture in her gallery  and in 1964 organized Canadian Sculpture Today, a forward-looking show with a catalogue. Sculptors in the exhibition included, among others, Sorel Etrog, Anne Kahane, Robert Murray, Françoise Sullivan, Harold Town, and Walter Yarwood. In 1965, she organized a group show which included fibre sculptor Charlotte Lindgren. She also was the consultant on sculpture shows such as Sculpture '67 in Toronto for which she selected the work of 54 sculptors, most of them modernist, such as Robert Murray.

In 1965, she was charged and convicted of exhibiting seven obscene drawings after a 1965 show on the theme of physical love, Eros '65 (she was the first art dealer to be so charged in Canada). Five of the banned works were by Robert Markle. The other two were by New Brunswick`s Fred Ross and David Lawrence Chapman. The seven works were seized by the morality police, and were identified by them as "allegedly obscene". One of these pieces, Lovers I by Markle allegedly depicted lesbian activity, resulting in celebrity status for Markle due to media attention . Cameron appealed her conviction on charges of exposing "obscene pictures to public view" all the way to the Supreme Court of Canada, but lost and closed her gallery. Robert Fulford called her trial for obscenity “a comedy of mutual incomprehension.”

At the age of 55, after losing sight in her right eye, she began to make art propelled by the encouragement of Jungian analyst Fraser Boa. She had three one-person shows and her work was shown in several group exhibitions. The Robert McLaughlin Gallery organized Dorothy Cameron: Private Eye, a selection of the works which she had created over 12 years (1979–1991). As the curator of the show wrote, these large idiosyncratic constructions in clay, papier-mâché and other materials (Cameron called them "assemblages") are an object lesson for artists who seek to pursue the theme of identity through the context of their work. These works, are Cameron`s own unusual "flamboyant" mixture, a combination of reflection and expression. They speak about different stages of life, and different ways of facing reality.

Personal life
In the early 1970s, she married Ron Bloore. Dorothy Cameron Bloore died of pneumonia in Toronto, in January 2000.

References

Bibliography 
 
 
 
Jeremy Brown and Tom Hedley, “The Incredible Trial of Dorothy Cameron,” Toronto Telegram, Volume XXXIV:1, 27 Nov. 1965

1924 births
2000 deaths
University of Toronto alumni
Artists from Toronto
Canadian installation artists
20th-century Canadian painters
20th-century Canadian women artists
 Canadian art dealers